A servant bell or service bell is a bell used to call the attention of an in-house servant.

History 
In the 18th century, British country houses grew in size and servants were moved to separate service wings. Servants were further moved out of sight with the use of service tunnels, basement walkways and utility rooms. With this followed a need for new methods of communication.

Rooms were fitted with bell pulls or levers which a household member could pull. A system of wires connected the pull to a bell located in a service area; in stairwells, outside servants' quarters or inside servants' rooms.

The bells were fixed to a board and each bell was individually labelled so servants could see which room requested service.

Bells hung from coiled springs. A pendulum connected to the spring would continue so swing, giving servants time to see which bell had rung. Bells could be of different sizes and emit different sound, thus allowing servants to identify the bell by sound.

How quickly the bells were answered was often a matter of complaint.

Marilyn Palmer commented that "No object is more evocative of historic household communication than the sprung bell."

See also 
 Call bell

References

Further reading 
 Technology in the Country House by Marilyn Palmer and Ian West

Bells (percussion)